Bollschweil Priory was a Cluniac monastery of nuns at Bollschweil (formerly Bolesweiler) in the district of Breisgau-Hochschwarzwald, Baden-Württemberg, Germany.

It was founded by Saint Ulrich of Zell in or after 1087 to complement the monastery he had founded for monks at Grüningen, later moved to Zell. The priory was moved to nearby Sölden in 1115, probably due to the unsuitability of the site, after which time the monastic community became known as Sölden Priory.

See also
Sölden Priory
Abbey of Cluny

References

Cluniac nunneries
Monasteries in Baden-Württemberg
Cluniac monasteries in Germany
Christian monasteries established in the 11th century
Religious organizations established in the 1080s
11th-century establishments in the Holy Roman Empire
Buildings and structures in Breisgau-Hochschwarzwald